Langer is a surname originally of German origin.  For the etymology, meaning, and pronunciation of the name, and for the Hiberno-English slang word, see Wiktionary.

People with the family name Langer include:

Academics and scientists
Alois Langer, biomedical engineer
Arthur M. Langer, professor of professional practice
Bernard Langer (surgeon), surgeon
Ellen Langer, professor of psychology
James S. Langer, professor of physics
Jerzy Langer, professor of physics
Karl Langer, (1819-1887), professor of anatomy
 Langer's lines, named for him
Lawrence L. Langer, Holocaust scholar
Lawrence M. Langer, professor of physics
Robert S. Langer, chemical engineer
Rudolf Ernest Langer, mathematician
the Langer correction, named for him
Ruth Langer, professor of theology
Salomon Z. Langer, pharmacologist
Susanne Langer, professor of philosophy
Walter C. Langer, psychoanalyst
William L. Langer, historian

Artists and entertainers
A. J. Langer, American actress
Clive Langer, British record producer
Elena Langer, Russian-British composer
Eli Langer, Canadian artist
Gilda Langer, German actress
Jason Langer, American photographer
Mads Langer, Danish singer-songwriter
Milan Langer, Czech pianist

Politicians and activists
Albert Langer, Australian political activist
Langer vote, named for him
Alexander Langer, Italian journalist, peace activist, politician, translator, and teacher
Ivan Langer, Czech politician
Felicia Langer, Israeli advocate for Palestinian human rights
Kris Langer, American politician from South Dakota
Mimí Langer, Austrian activist
William Langer, American politician from North Dakota
William Langer (Assemblyman), American politician from Wisconsin

Sportspeople
Allan Langer, Australian rugby league footballer
Anja Langer, German bodybuilder
Bernhard Langer, German golfer
Jim Langer,  American football player
Justin Langer, Australian cricketer
Lucyna Langer, Polish athlete
Ludy Langer, American swimmer
Lutz Langer, German Paralympic athlete
Michael Langer, Austrian footballer
Nils Langer, German tennis player
Rob Langer, Australian cricketer
Rudolf Langer, German athlete
 Ruth Langer (1921-1999), Austrian swimmer
Scott Langer, American hockey coach
Sylvia Langer, German swimmer

Writers
Adam Langer, American author
František Langer, Czech playwright
"Franz Langer", a pen name for German author Karl May
Jiří Langer, Czech poet

Others
Anton de Franckenpoint, nicknamed "Anton Langer", first person scientifically verified to have been over 8 feet tall
Gertrude Langer, Austrian-Australian art critic
Gwido Langer, Polish cryptologist
Karl Langer (architect), Austrian-Australian architect
Langer House, named for him
Karl-Heinz Langer, a German Luftwaffe pilot
Mayanti Langer, Indian TV presenter

Fictional characters
Karla-Heinrike Langer, a character from Strike Witches
Clyde Langer, a main character from The Sarah Jane Adventures

Locations
Langer Bach, a river in Germany
Langer Eugen, an office building in Germany
Langer Heinrich mine, a mine in Namibia
Langer See, a lake in Germany

German-language surnames
Surnames from nicknames